"Roland the Headless Thompson Gunner" is a song composed by Warren Zevon and David Lindell and performed by Zevon. It was first released on Zevon's 1978 album Excitable Boy. It was the last song he performed in front of an audience, on The Late Show with David Letterman, before his death in 2003.

About the song
Zevon met co-writer Lindell in 1973 in Sitges, Spain, where the latter was running a bar, the Dubliner, after a stint working as a mercenary in Africa. Always interested in the darker side of life, Zevon decided to collaborate with Lindell on a song about a mercenary.

The fictional character Roland is a Norwegian who becomes embroiled in the aftermath of the Nigerian Civil War and Congo Crisis of the 1960s. The lyrics mention a "Congo war" and the years 1966 and 1967, which correspond to the mercenary-led Kisangani Mutinies after the Congo Crisis. He earns a reputation as the greatest Thompson gunner, a reputation that attracts the attention of the CIA. Roland is betrayed and murdered by a fellow mercenary, Van Owen, who blows off his head. Roland becomes the phantom "headless Thompson gunner" and eventually has his revenge, when he catches Van Owen in a Mombasa bar and guns him down. Afterward, he continues "wandering through the night". Other violent conflicts of the succeeding decade are said to be haunted by Roland, including Ireland; Lebanon; Palestine; and Berkeley, California, and the song concludes with the suggestion that the Patty Hearst controversy was inspired by Roland as well.

Film reference
The song is a favorite of screenwriter David Koepp.  He named the big-game hunter in The Lost World: Jurassic Park "Roland Tembo" as a reference to the song, and then "thought it would be fun to make his nemesis' last name Van Owen, like in the song."

See also
 Headless Horseman

References

External links
 

1978 songs
Cold War fiction
Fictional contract killers
Fictional gunfighters
Fictional mercenaries
Fictional murdered people
Fictional Norwegian people
Fictional soldiers
Fictional war veterans
Fictional zombies and revenants
Songs about fictional male characters
Songs about revenge
Songs about soldiers
Songs written by Warren Zevon
Warren Zevon songs